Ignacio Walker Prieto (born 7 January 1956) is a Chilean lawyer, politician, and, author who was Foreign Minister of Chile (2004–2006).

Academic, Legal, and Political History
Upon Walker's graduation from the University of Chile in 1978, he joined Vicaría de la Solidaridad as an attorney-at-law. At Vicaría de la Solidaridad, Walker defended people against human rights violations committed by the regime of General Augusto Pinochet.  

Walker was Deputy in the Chilean Parliament (1994–2002), President of the Chilean Christian Democratic Party (2010-2015),  Chilean Senator (2010-2018), and Foreign Minister (2004-2006) for the Republic of Chile. In 1982, he earned a PhD in political science from Princeton University. Between 2007 and 2008, he was a visiting professor and researcher at Princeton University. In 2018, Walker became the Kellogg Institute’s Hewlett Fellow for Public Policy at the University of Notre Dame. 

On September 27, 2018, Walker participated as a panel member on the Kellogg Institute's Inter-American dialogue commemorating the 30th anniversary  of the Chilean plebiscite (political referendum) of October 5, 1988, which opened the way to a return to democracy in Chile after the Pinochet regime. The historic panel included key leaders from both sides of the political aisle who  recalled and reflected upon the "NO" campaign which led to Chile's limitation and rejection of Pinochet as President followed by the country's transition to democracy. Along with Walker, members of the historic panel included Andrés Allamand - Senator of Chile, Eugenio Tiron - Executive President of Tironi Associates, Rev. Timothy R. Scully - Professor of Political Science and Hacket Family Director of the Institute for Educational Initiatives, and J. Samuel Valenzuela - Professor of Sociology, University of Notre Dame.

Family History
He has eight siblings, including politicians Patricio Walker and Matías Walker.

On March 22, 1980, he married the singer Cecilia Echenique. The couple have three children: Elisa (lawyer), Ignacio (filmmaker) and Benjamin (musician).

Publications
2020 -- Cristianos sin Cristiandad: (reflexiones de un legislador católico)
2018 -- La Nueva Mayoría. Reflexiones sobre una derrota
2018 -- Democracia Cristiana que queremos: El chile que soñamos
2016 -- Democracy in Latin America: Between Hope and Despair (Kellogg Institute Series on Democracy and Development)
2009 -- La Democracia En América Latina
2006 -- Chile and Latin America in a Globalized World
1990 -- Socialismo Y Democracia: Chile Y Europa En Perspectiva Comparada
1986 -- Democracia En Chile; Doce Conferencias (with José A. Vieragallo, et al.)

Awards
2005 -- Grand Cross of the Order of the Infante Dom Henrique -- Prince Henry the Navigator (November 22, 2005) 
2004 -- Grand Cross of the Order of the Sun of Peru (December 10, 2004)

References

1956 births
Living people
University of Chile alumni
Princeton University alumni
Christian Democratic Party (Chile) politicians
Foreign ministers of Chile
Members of the Chamber of Deputies of Chile
Members of the Senate of Chile
Politicians from Santiago
Chilean people of English descent
20th-century Chilean lawyers
Academic staff of the Pontifical Catholic University of Valparaíso